Mansong Diarra (–1808), also rendered Monzon Jara, was ruler of the Bambara Empire from 1795 to 1808.

Son of king Ngolo Diarra, Monzon or Mansong assumed the throne of Ségou following his father's death. He earned renown as a great warrior, with defeats against several other groups, including Kaarta, Massina, Dogon, and Mossi.

His son Da Diarra would succeed him after his death.

References

History of Mali
Bamana Empire
18th-century rulers in Africa
19th-century rulers in Africa
Year of birth uncertain
1808 deaths